The Malaysian United Democratic Alliance (Malay: Ikatan Demokratik Malaysia, Chinese: 马来西亚民主联合阵线, Tamil: மலேசிய ஐக்கிய ஜனநாயக கூட்டணி; abbreviated: MUDA) is a multi-racial and youth-centric political party in Malaysia formed by Syed Saddiq Syed Abdul Rahman in September 2020.

History

Formation 
The Malaysian United Democratic Alliance was formed by Syed Saddiq Syed Abdul Rahman in September 2020. Previously, Syed Saddiq served as Minister of Youth and Sports in the Pakatan Harapan (PH) administration. He was the youngest-ever Malaysian politician in a Cabinet post when appointed in 2018 at the age of 25. He is also the Member of Parliament (MP) for Muar, and originally a member of the Malaysian United Indigenous Party (BERSATU), but his party membership was terminated amid the February 2020 Sheraton Move, along with four other MPs including ex-Prime Minister Mahathir Mohamad. Mahathir later formed the Homeland Fighters' Party (PEJUANG) and Syed Saddiq retreat from joining the Mahathir's new party. On 17 September 2020, he formally applied to register his own new party with the current name with Registrar of Societies (RoS). At the time of 2020 political crisis, Malaysian politicians had been fighting for control of parliament, with the PN coalition holding a very thin majority.

MUDA has been sponsored by Syed Saddiq, Amir Abd Hadi, Dr. Tanussha Francis Xavier, Sharizal Denci, Afiqah Zulkifli, Lim Wei Jiet, Luqman Long, Radzi Tajuddin, Tarmizi Anuwar, Dr. Mathen Muniasupran, Mutalib Uthman, Siti Rahayu Baharin and Dr. Teo Lee Ken. Syed Saddiq has stated that MUDA is modeled after two other political parties: La Republique En Marche! of France and the now-defunct Future Forward Party of Thailand. He has also stated that his party will be multi-racial and youth-based, representing "all levels of society, regardless of race, religion or age". The formation of this party follows a trend of millennial-based political parties in South Asia, such as the Indonesian Solidarity Party in Indonesia and the Future Forward Party in Thailand. MUDA seeks to be disruptive, pro-democracy and based on reform and policy. It targets "middle Malaysia" with promises of "meritocratic, racially inclusive and policy-driven governance", and is also targeting the unregistered electorate.

Rejected registration and court case 
MUDA's registration was rejected by the RoS on 6 January 2021 via a RoS email which no reason was given for the rejection. On 12 January, MUDA through its 13 pro-tem committee, including Syed Saddiq has seek a court order to quash the decision of Minister of Home Affairs and RoS to register it. Judge Mariana Yahya had set the date 4 February 2021 after hearing arguments from MUDA's lawyers' team the High Court of Malaysia to decide whether to allow MUDA a judicial review against the government decision. The lawyers representing MUDA are former attorney-general Tommy Thomas, Ambiga Sreenevasan and Lim Wei Jiet.

Syed Saddiq claims the Home Affairs Minister Hamzah Zainudin had told him that his party would be registered and approved if he pledged to support the ruling Perikatan Nasional (PN) coalition. He also claims that Hamzah had asked him to refrain from voting on government bills he opposed as part of the deal. MUDA also alleged that the rejection was PN government's agenda to prevent it from participating in the next general election.

On 4 February, the High Court again dismissed a leave application by MUDA in its challenge to the rejection of its application as a political party. On the same day, MUDA filed a judicial review application, MUDA has questioned the RoS for still doing background checks on the party and not approving its application as a political party albeit after six months on 25 March. MUDA was allowed by the High Court to go ahead with a judicial review against the government's refusal to register it as a political party on 21 September. The High Court,  during case management, fixed 14 December to hear the application. The High Court has ordered the Home Affairs Ministry to allow the registration within 14 days on 14 December.

Legalised and registered 
MUDA was finally registered as an official political party amidst much hassles after its registration approval was notified via an email followed by an official letter by the RoS on 23 December 2021. As of 23 December 2021, the party is already listed as active by the RoS website. The successful registration allows the use of the party logo officially to contest future political elections. It was publicly announced only on 29 December 2021 as the event coincided with December 2021 Malaysian floods relief operations that involved the new party.

2022 Johor state election 
On 29 January 2022, MUDA confirmed its intention to participate in the Johor state election.

On 9 February 2022, DAP, AMANAH and MUDA signed an agreement unveiling the outcomes of their cooperation on seat negotiations by declaring that they will not contest against each other, with MUDA getting 6 seats previously allocated to DAP and AMANAH ranging from Tenang, Bukit Kepong, Parit Raja, Machap, Puteri Wangsa and Bukit Permai. MUDA also clarified that the seat negotiations with PKR are still ongoing to "achieve unity in facing this election" The three parties also said they would combine their election machinery to support all of their candidates as they were about to move on as election strategic partners although MUDA is not part of PH and this is in line with the "big camp" principle to unite all Opposition parties to take on the ruling BN coalition. They also promised to form the Johor state government together if they win in the election. Johor PKR Chairman Syed Ibrahim Syed Noh said PKR had offered 3 seats to MUDA and was awaiting a response to the offer.

On 13 March 2022, MUDA won one seat in the first election it contested. MUDA Secretary General Amira Aisya won the Puteri Wangsa seat. President of MUDA Syed Saddiq Syed Abdul Rahman described the victory in the seat out of the seven seats contested as the party's first step to continue to gain a foothold in the country's political landscape.

List of leaders

Leadership structure

 President:
 Syed Saddiq Syed Abdul Rahman
 Deputy President:
 Amira Aisya Abdul Aziz 
 Vice President:
 Dr. Thanussha Francis Xavier
 Dr. Teo Lee Ken
 Shahrizal Denci
 Zaidel Baharuddin
 Radzi Tajuddin
 Secretary-General:
 Amir Abd Hadi
Treasurer-General:
 Tarmizi Anuwar
 Information Chief:
 Luqman Long
 Chief of Staff:
 Shairy Hanapiah
 Central Executive Committee members:
 Amir Hadi
 Beatrice Chen 
 Dr. Mathen Nair
 Ismail Nasaruddin
 Lim Wei Jiet
 Nurul Rifayah Muhammad Iqbal
 Dian Lee Cheng Ling
 Khairi Zulfadhli
 Mifzal Mohammed
 Warence Mudin
 Afiqah Zulkifli
 Ainie Haziqah
 Aisyah Farhanah Mohamed
 Hafidzi Razali
 Zarul Afiq Arifudin
State Chairpersons:
 Sabah Region: Amos Thien
 Sarawak Region: Jeffrey Ngui
 Federal Territories Region: Taufiq Zarak
 Johor: Mohd Azrol Ab Rahani
 Kedah: Faqrul Asyraf
 Kelantan: Badzlan Bakar
 Melaka: Yosh Wong
 Negeri Sembilan: Eric Low Chern Yuen
 Pahang: Vacant
 Penang: B Tineshvar
 Perak: S Devadas
 Perlis: Afif Zulhusni
 Selangor: Al Hafiz Ikhwan
 Terengganu: Asyrul Malek

Elected representatives

Dewan Rakyat (House of Representatives)

Members of Parliament of the 15th Malaysian Parliament 

MUDA currently has a single MP in the Dewan Rakyat.

Dewan Undangan Negeri (State Legislative Assembly) 

Johor State Legislative Assembly

General election results

State election results

See also
Politics of Malaysia
List of political parties in Malaysia

References

External links
 
 

Political parties in Malaysia
Political parties established in 2020